Popham is a surname.

List of people with the surname 

 Alexander Popham (1605–1669), English Member of Parliament in the Long Parliament
 Alix Popham (born 1979), Welsh rugby union player
 Arthur E. Popham (1889–1970), British art historian
 Ben Popham (born 2000), Australian Paralympic swimmer
 Edward Popham (1610–1651), General-at-Sea during the English Civil War on the Parliamentarian side
 Edward William Leybourne Popham of Littlecote House, Sheriff of Wiltshire in 1830
 Francis Popham of Littlecote House, Sheriff of Wiltshire in 1612
 Francis Popham of Littlecote House, died Hunstrete House in 1779
 Francis Leybourne Popham of Littlecote House, Sheriff of Wiltshire in 1853
 George Popham (1550–1608), pioneering colonist in Maine born in Somerset, England
 Home Riggs Popham (1762–1820), British naval officer; inventor of a numeric code for signal flags
 John Popham (military commander) (died 1460s), under Henry V, speaker of the House of Commons under Henry VI
 John Popham (Lord Chief Justice) (1531–1607), Speaker of the House of Commons and Lord Chief Justice of England
 Lana Popham (born 1968), Canadian politician in the 39th Parliament of British Columbia
 Mervyn Popham (1927–2000), British archaeologist and prehistorian 
 Sir Stephen Popham (English MP) Kt. (1386–1444), High Sheriff of Wiltshire, English MP for Hampshire
 Stephen Popham (1745–1795), member of Parliament of Ireland for Castlebar, made improvements to Chennai, India
 Stuart Popham, British lawyer
 Thurstan de Popham, Sheriff of Hampshire in 1150
 Robert Brooke-Popham (1878–1953), British air chief marshal

Surnames
English-language surnames
Surnames of English origin
Surnames of British Isles origin